Carposina siturga is a moth in the family Carposinidae. It was described by Edward Meyrick in 1912. It is found in South Africa.

References

Endemic moths of South Africa
Carposinidae
Moths described in 1912
Moths of Africa